James Holt (born November 24, 1986 in Altus, Oklahoma) is a former American football linebacker. He was signed by the San Diego Chargers as an undrafted free agent in 2009.  He played college football at the University of Kansas.

External links

San Diego Chargers bio
Kansas Jayhawks bio

1986 births
Living people
People from Altus, Oklahoma
Players of American football from Oklahoma
American football linebackers
Kansas Jayhawks football players
San Diego Chargers players